Isenburg-Offenbach was the name of a state of the Holy Roman Empire, based around Offenbach and Neu Isenburg (built by the counts in 1699) in modern Hesse, Germany. It was created as a partition of Isenburg-Büdingen-Birstein in 1628. In 1711 the immediacy passed to Isenburg-Birstein while the line was partitioned into Isenburg-Eisenberg and Isenburg-Philippseich.

Counties of the Holy Roman Empire
House of Isenburg